Diaprepes Schönherr 1823: 1140  is a genus of broad-nosed weevil belonging to the family Curculionidae, subfamily Entiminae, tribe Eustylini.

It is part of the so-called Exophthalmus genus complex.

Distribution 
Distributed in the Caribbean, Central America and Florida: Trinidad, Venezuela; Honduras, Nicaragua; Antigua, Barbados, Cuba, Dominica, Guadeloupe, Haiti, Hispaniola, Martinique, Mona, Montserrat, Nevis, Puerto Rico, St. Barthelemy, St. Croix, St. Kitts, St. Lucia, St. Thomas, St. Vincent, Vieques; SE USA (Florida).

Species
 Diaprepes abbreviatus  (Linnaeus, 1758)  
 Diaprepes balloui  Marshall, 1916 
 Diaprepes boxi  Marshall, 1938 
 Diaprepes comma  Boheman, 1834 
 Diaprepes doublierii  Guérin, 1847 
 Diaprepes excavatus  Rosenschoeld, 1840 
 Diaprepes famelicus  (Olivier, 1790) 
 Diaprepes glaucus  (Olivier, 1807) 
 Diaprepes marginatus  (Fabricius, 1775) 
 Diaprepes maugei  (Boheman, 1840) 
 Diaprepes reticulatus  Chevrolat, 1880 
 Diaprepes revestitus  Chevrolat, 1880 
 Diaprepes rohrii  (Fabricius, 1775) 
 Diaprepes rufescens  Boheman, 1840 
 Diaprepes sommeri  (Rosenschoeld, 1840) 
 Diaprepes variegatus  Chevrolat, 1880

References

Entiminae
Curculionidae genera